Daniel Finch, 2nd Earl of Nottingham, 7th Earl of Winchilsea, PC (2 July 16471 January 1730) was an English Tory statesman who supported the Hanoverian Succession in 1714.

Origins
He was born on 2 July 1647, the son of Heneage Finch, 1st Earl of Nottingham (1620-1682), Lord Chancellor of England, by his wife Elizabeth Harvey, a daughter of Daniel Harvey.

Education
Little is known about his upbringing. He entered Westminster School in 1658, where he boarded for three years at the house of Dr. Richard Busby, the headmaster and his father's former tutor at Christ Church, Oxford. Daniel also went to Christ Church and the excellence of his studies made his father doubt their authenticity. He matriculated at Christ Church as a Gentleman Commoner on 26 July 1662. 

In April 1663, his father wrote to him, advising that he "loose not the reputation which I am told you have gayn'd of diligence and sobriety". His father also advised him a month after he had arrived in Oxford "to frequent the publique prayers, and study to reverence and defend, as well as to obey, the Church of England" and when his first Easter away from home was approaching, he wrote, "Nothing can make you truly wise but such a religion as dwells upon your heart and governs your whole life". However, Finch suffered from illness and it may be due to this that he left Oxford without graduating. 

Finch went on his Grand Tour from 1665 to 1668, visiting Frankfurt, Munich, Venice, Florence, Naples, Rome and Paris. After he returned to England he was appointed a Fellow of the Royal Society and his cousin Sir Roger Twysden wrote to Finch's father that "every body speaks him a very gentleman, and one you and your lady are likely to have much comfort in".

Career

Daniel Finch entered parliament for Lichfield in 1679. In 1682 he succeeded his father as Earl of Nottingham. He was one of the privy councillors who in 1685 signed the order for the proclamation of the Duke of York, but during the whole of the reign of James II, he kept away from the court. At the last moment, he hesitated to join in the invitation to William of Orange and after the flight of James II, he was the leader of the party who were in favour of James being King in name and William being regent.

He declined the office of Lord Chancellor under William and Mary, but accepted that of Secretary of State, retaining it until December 1693. Under Queen Anne in 1702, he again accepted the same office in the ministry of Lord Godolphin, but finally retired in 1704.

In 1711, during the War of the Spanish Succession, the Tory ministry of Robert Harley, 1st Earl of Oxford was attempting to negotiate peace with France. On 7 December Finch moved the 'No peace without Spain' amendment to the vote of thanks, which condemned any peace with France that left Spain and the West Indies in possession of a member of the House of Bourbon. Finch spoke for one hour and declared that "though he had fourteen children, he would submit to live upon five hundred pounds a year rather than consent to those dark and unknown conditions of peace".

On the accession of King George I he was made Lord President of the Council but in 1716 he finally withdrew from office. On 9 September 1729, he succeeded to the title Earl of Winchilsea (which thenceforth became united with his paternal title of Earl of Nottingham) and died on 1 January 1730.

Marriages and issue
He married twice:

Firstly, on 16 June 1674, to Lady Essex Rich, a daughter of Robert Rich, 3rd Earl of Warwick by his wife Anne Cheeke. By his first wife he had 8 children of whom only one daughter survived to adulthood: 
Mary Finch (born 1677), who married firstly John Ker, 1st Duke of Roxburghe, and secondly (as his second wife) William Savile, 2nd Marquess of Halifax.

Secondly, on 29 December 1685, he married Anne Hatton (1668–1743), a daughter of Christopher Hatton, 1st Viscount Hatton. She was appointed a Lady of the Bedchamber to Queen Mary II in 1691. By his second wife (who had over twenty pregnancies) he had at least twelve surviving children, including:
Daniel Finch, 8th Earl of Winchilsea (24 May 16892 August 1769), eldest son and heir, who married firstly Lady Frances Feilding, a daughter of Basil Feilding, 4th Earl of Denbigh and secondly Mary Palmer, a daughter of Sir Thomas Palmer, 1st Baronet. He left no known descendants.
William Finch (169025 December 1766), who married Charlotte Fermor, a daughter of Thomas Fermor, 1st Earl of Pomfret, by whom he had issue including Sophia Finch and her younger brother George Finch, 9th Earl of Winchilsea.
John Finch (1692–1763), who left a daughter.
Hon. Henry Finch (169426 April 1761), whose illegitimate daughter, Charlotte (died 5 April 1810), married Thomas Raikes, Governor of the Bank of England;
Edward Finch (169716 May 1771), a Member of Parliament, who married Ann Palmer, another daughter of Sir Thomas Palmer, 1st Baronet. They had three children. He later took the surname Finch-Hatton, and his grandson was George Finch-Hatton, 10th Earl of Winchilsea.
Lady Essex Finch (28 Feb 168723 May 1721), who in 1703 married Sir Roger Mostyn, 3rd Baronet of Mostyn. They were parents to Sir Thomas Mostyn, 4th Baronet of Mostyn and two other children.
Lady Charlotte Finch (1693 (?1711)21 January 1773), who in 1725 became the second wife of Charles Seymour, 6th Duke of Somerset, and was the mother of Lady Charlotte Seymour and Lady Frances Seymour.
Lady (Cecilia) Isabella Finch (1700–1771), who never married but became first Lady of the Bedchamber to Princess Amelia, a spinster aunt of King George III. In 1740 she commissioned William Kent to build her a magnificent townhouse at 44 Berkeley Square in Mayfair, London, which is famed for its theatrical staircase. It was purchased after her death by William Henry Fortescue, 1st Earl of Clermont (1722–1806), and served as his London townhouse. In the 20th century it was used as the Clermont Club.
Lady Mary Finch (170130 May 1761) (not to be confused with her elder half-sister), who in 1716 married Thomas Watson-Wentworth, 1st Marquess of Rockingham.
Lady Henrietta Finch (170214 April 1742), who in 1723 married William Fitzroy, 3rd Duke of Cleveland. No known descendants.
Lady Elizabeth Finch (170410 April 1784), who married William Murray, 1st Earl of Mansfield. No known descendants.

Assessment by Macaulay

The Whig historian Lord Macaulay said of Lord Nottingham in 1848:
This son, Earl Daniel, was an honourable and virtuous man. Though enslaved by some absurd prejudices, and though liable to strange fits of caprice, he cannot be accused of having deviated from the path of right in search either of unlawful gain or of unlawful pleasure. Like his father he was a distinguished speaker, impressive, but prolix, and too monotonously solemn. The person of the orator was in perfect harmony with his oratory. His attitude was rigidly erect: his complexion so dark that he might have passed for a native of a warmer climate than ours; and his harsh features were composed to an expression resembling that of a chief mourner at a funeral. It was commonly said that he looked rather like a Spanish grandee than like an English gentleman. The nicknames of Dismal, Don Dismallo, and Don Diego, were fastened on him by jesters, and are not yet forgotten. He had paid much attention to the science by which his family had been raised to greatness, and was, for a man born to rank and wealth, wonderfully well read in the laws of his country. He was a devoted son of the Church, and showed his respect for her in two ways not usual among those Lords who in his time boasted that they were her especial friends, by writing tracts in defence of her dogmas, and by shaping his private life according to her precepts. Like other zealous churchmen, he had, till recently, been a strenuous supporter of monarchical authority. But to the policy which had been pursued since the suppression of the Western insurrection he was bitterly hostile, and not the less so because his younger brother Heneage had been turned out of the office of Solicitor General for refusing to defend the King's dispensing power.

Notes

References

Henry Horwitz, Revolution Politicks. The Career of Daniel Finch, Second Earl of Nottingham, 1647–1730 (Cambridge: Cambridge University Press, 1968).
Henry Horwitz, Finch,  Daniel, second earl of Nottingham and seventh earl of Winchilsea  (1647–1730), Oxford Dictionary of National Biography, Oxford University Press, 2004; online edn, Jan 2009, accessed 30 January 2011.
Thomas Babington Macaulay, The History of England from the Accession of James the Second. Popular Edition in Two Volumes (London: Longmans, 1889).
Burke's Peerage (1939 edition), s.v. Winchilsea 
Pearl Finch, "History of Burley-on-the-Hill, Rutland", Volume 1 (London: J. Bale,Sons & Danielsson Ltd, 1901)

1647 births
1730 deaths
British Secretaries of State
07
702
Knights of the Garter
Lord Presidents of the Council
Lords of the Admiralty
Members of the Privy Council of England
Secretaries of State for the Northern Department
Fellows of the Royal Society
Daniel
English MPs 1661–1679
English MPs 1680–1681
English MPs 1681
People from Burley, Rutland
Members of Parliament for the Isle of Wight
Daniel